Bugoloobi sometimes spelled as Bugolobi though incorrect, is a location in Kampala, Uganda's capital and largest city. It is a suburban neighborhood and some of the most valuable properties in Kampala are found here. It is among the most developed neighborhoods in Kampala and Uganda in general.

Location
Bugolobi is bordered by Nakawa and Mbuya to the north, Mutungo to the east, Kitintale and Luzira to the southeast, Muyenga to the south and southeast, Namuwongo to the west and Kampala's Industrial Area to the northwest. The coordinates of Bugoloobi are:0°18'36.0"N, 32°37'30.0"E (Latitude:0.3100; Longitude:32.6250).

Overview
Bugoloobi is a Kampala neighborhood, situated on Bugoloobi Hill. On the lower reaches of the hill, to the northwest, the neighborhood is contiguous with the city's Industrial Area. However, the commercial real estate in the neighborhood is upscale. On the eastern slopes of the hill is a large apartment complex with lower middle-class tenants. The northern slopes and southern slopes of the hill, as well as the summit are occupied by residential bungalows, with the size of the homes getting larger, as you approach the top of the hill.

Points of interest
The following points of interest are found in Bugoloobi:
 Paragon Hospital - A 350-bed, upscale private hospital  
 Resurrection Church Bugolobi - A place of worship affiliated with the Pentecostal Movement
 Dolphin Suites - Plunge into Luxury (Accommodation, Restaurant, Gym, Spa, Steam, Sauna, Swimming Pool, Indian & Continental food)
 National Forestry Authority Gardens
 Teddy Bear Kindergarten & Day Care Center 
 Royal Suites Bugoloobi - A private resort development
 Uganda Vacation Rental Condos
 A branch of DFCU Bank - One of the twenty-five licensed commercial banks in Uganda
 Village Mall, Bugoloobi - An upscale shopping mall, with a supermarket, restaurants, saloons, boutiques and other shops
 Tulifanya Restaurant 
 Good African Coffee Factory 
 Bugoloobi View Villas - An upscale residential neighborhood. In development.
 Uganda Communications Commission Office Complex 
 Nakumatt Supermarket - A private supermarket chain with eight outlets in Uganda as of June 2014. - The Anchor Store At Village Mall
 Bougainviller Hotel - A private hotel/motel.
 A local franchise of Kentucky Fried Chicken - Located Inside Village Mall

See also

References

External links

Neighborhoods of Kampala
Nakawa Division